Paulo Simão (born April 27, 1976) is a Portuguese basketball player, who plays for CF Belenenses.  He has played for the Portugal national basketball team.

References

External links
 LCB Profile

1976 births
Sportspeople from Barreiro, Portugal
Living people
Portuguese men's basketball players
Point guards